David Lloyd-Jones or David Lloyd Jones may refer to:

 David L. Jones (botanist) (born 1944), Australian botanist
 David Lloyd-Jones (conductor) (1934–2022), British conductor
 David Lloyd Jones, Lord Lloyd-Jones (born 1952), British Supreme Court judge
 David Lloyd Jones (architect) (born 1942), British architect

See also
David Jones (disambiguation)
David Lloyd (disambiguation)